Ivan Henry Meyer (born 28 March 1962) is a South African politician who has been serving as the Western Cape Provincial Minister of Agriculture since 2019. He has held multiple positions in the provincial cabinet. Meyer  was elected to the Western Cape Provincial Parliament in 2009. He has also been the Federal Chairperson of the Democratic Alliance (DA) since November 2020, a position he previously held in an acting capacity from November 2019 to November 2020. Meyer had served as the First Deputy Federal Chairperson of the DA from 2010 to 2012, and again from 2015 to 2019. He was also the provincial leader of the party in the Western Cape from 2012 to 2015.

Career
Meyer served as the chief director of Provincial Training in the Corporate Services Directorate of the Western Cape Provincial Administration.
He was a Senior Lecturer in Public Policy and Local Governance at the University of Stellenbosch.  He has also published various works in the fields of education, housing, local government and public administration. Many of his poems were published in the 2012 Afrikaans anthology, Teater van ‘n Velore Tyd.

Political career
In April 2009, Meyer was elected to the Western Cape Provincial Parliament. He was inaugurated as a Member on 6 May 2009. The following day, 7 May 2009, Premier Helen Zille named her Provincial Cabinet and appointed Meyer to the post of Provincial Minister of Social Development. He was sworn in on the same day.

He was elected as one of three Deputy Federal Chairpersons of the DA in July 2010.

Meyer served as Provincial Minister of Social Development until September 2010, when Zille reshuffled her Provincial Cabinet and announced that Patricia de Lille, the Leader of the Independent Democrats, would succeed Meyer. He was appointed Provincial Minister of Cultural Affairs and Sport, succeeding  Sakkie Jenner.

In October 2012, he declared his candidacy to replace Theuns Botha as Provincial Leader of the Western Cape. Botha had announced his intention to retire as leader, and Meyer was elected unopposed at the party's Provincial Congress on 13 October 2012. He resigned as a Deputy Federal Chairperson on the same day.

In May 2014, he was re-elected for a second term as a Member of the Western Cape Provincial Parliament. Zille appointed him to the post of Provincial Minister of Finance. He took office on 26 May 2014.

Meyer announced in April 2015 that he would stand down as Provincial Leader of the Democratic Alliance. He was succeeded by Patricia de Lille. He announced at the party's Provincial Congress that he was running to be one of the DA's three federal chairperson deputies. Meyer was elected on 10 May 2015 at the party's Federal Congress as the first of the three deputies.

In April 2018, Meyer was re-elected as a deputy federal chairperson. He served alongside Mike Waters and Refiloe Nt'sekhe.

In May 2019, newly elected premier Alan Winde appointed Meyer as Provincial Minister of Agriculture.

In October 2019, Meyer announced his candidacy for the post of interim Federal Chairperson of the Democratic Alliance. The post became vacant after party veteran Athol Trollip resigned. He faced Nomafrench Mbombo and Khume Ramulifho for the position. Meyer won the election. He was elected to a full term in 2020.

Personal life
He is married and has children.

References

Living people
Democratic Alliance (South Africa) politicians
People from the Western Cape
21st-century South African politicians
Members of the Western Cape Provincial Parliament
Coloured South African people
1962 births